Vintage is the sixth album by Canned Heat.  Produced by Johnny Otis, the album featured the Muddy Waters/Elmore James' song "Rollin' and Tumblin'" recorded with and without Alan Wilson's harmonica leads. These sessions have surfaced on a multiple of reissues including, Don't Forget to Boogie: Vintage Heat (2002), Vintage Canned Heat (1996), Eternal Boogie, Canned Heat in Concert and various other releases.

Track listing

Side One
"Spoonful" (Willie Dixon) – 2:30
"Big Road Blues" (Tommy Johnson) – 2:08
"Rollin' and Tumblin'" (Muddy Waters) – 2:17 without harmonica
"Got My Mojo Working" (Preston Foster) – 2:44
"Pretty Thing" (Dixon) – 2:01

Side Two
"Louise" (Chester Burnett) – 3:07
"Dimples" (John Lee Hooker) – 2:21
"Can't Hold on Much Longer" (W. Jacobs) – 2:32
"Straight Ahead" (Canned Heat) – 2:35
"Rollin' and Tumblin'" (Waters) – 2:07 with (Alan Wilson on) harmonica

Personnel
Canned Heat
Bob Hite – vocals
Alan Wilson – slide guitar, vocals, harmonica
Henry Vestine – lead guitar
Stuart Brotman – bass
Frank Cook – drums

Production
Johnny Otis – Producer- 1966- This was when the band was known as the Canned Heat Blues Band, these were demos and were the first time Canned Heat recorded in a studio, they were not released until 1970, this from page 94 of a book written by Rebecca Davis entitled "Blind Owl Blues: The Mysterious Life and Death of Blues Legend Alan Wilson"

References

1970 albums
Canned Heat albums
Janus Records albums